Dalla spica is a species of butterfly in the family Hesperiidae. It is found in Argentina and Bolivia.

Subspecies
Dalla spica spica - Argentina
Dalla spica livia Evans, 1955 - Bolivia

References

Butterflies described in 1939
spica